Satarovsky is a rural locality (a khutor) in Bocharovskoye Rural Settlement, Novoanninsky District, Volgograd Oblast, Russia. The population was 243 as of 2010. There are 9 streets.

Geography 
Satarovsky is located 38 km southwest of Novoanninsky (the district's administrative centre) by road. Krasny Oktyabr is the nearest rural locality.

References 

Rural localities in Novoanninsky District